Bruce Cork (1916 – October 7, 1994) was a physicist who discovered the antineutron in 1956 while working at the Lawrence Berkeley National Laboratory. He retired from Lawrence in 1986. He died October 7, 1994 at the age of 78 after a long illness.

External links
 Includes Obituary

1916 births
1994 deaths
20th-century American physicists
American nuclear physicists